John Wilkie (born 24 March 1977 in Murwillumbah) is an Australian slalom canoeist who competed from the mid-1990s to the mid-2000s. He finished in 21st place in the K1 event at the 2000 Summer Olympics in Sydney after being eliminated in the qualifying round.

World Cup individual podiums

1 Continental Cup Oceania counting for World Cup points

References

1977 births
Australian male canoeists
Canoeists at the 2000 Summer Olympics
Living people
Olympic canoeists of Australia